Siberians is a 1940 Soviet drama film directed by Lev Kuleshov.

Plot 

On one New Year the old hunter tells two middle-school students the story of how Stalin presented his tobacco pipe to one hunter for help with his escape from exile. According to legend, the hunter died during the Civil War, and the pipe remained with his friend. The guys are interested in this story and they decide to find this pipe.

Starring 
 Aleksandra Kharitonova as Valia
 Aleksandr Kuznetsov as Serezha
 Aleksandr Pupko as Petja
 Mariya Vinogradova as Galka
 Daniil Sagal as Aleksei - hunter and Valia's uncle
 T. Alcheva as Anna Fedorovna
 Georgiy Millyar as Grandfather Jakov
 Aleksandra Khokhlova as Pelagueia
 Andrey Fayt as Dr. Vasili Vasilievich
 Andrei Gorchilin as Kolkhoz' chief
 Sergey Komarov as Terentij
 Dmitriy Orlov as Doshindon
 Mikheil Gelovani as Josef Stalin

References

External links 

1940 films
1940s Russian-language films
Soviet black-and-white films
Soviet drama films
1940 drama films